The Team normal hill/4 × 5 km competition at the FIS Nordic World Ski Championships 2021 was held on 28 February 2021.

Results

Ski jumping
The ski jumping part was started at 10:00.

Cross-country skiing
The cross-country skiing part was started at 15:00.

References

Team normal hill 4 x 5 km